Pinas is a published weekly by the Sonshine Media Network International located at 3rd floor, ACQ Tower Building, Sta. Rita Street, EDSA, Guadalupe Nuevo, Makati.

It has been reformatted by Tagalog version of the Pinas newspaper since March 2006.

Newspapers published in Metro Manila
Sonshine Media Network International
Weekly newspapers published in the Philippines